Brisk is a tea and juice brand managed by the Pepsi Lipton Partnership, a joint venture founded in 1991 between PepsiCo and Unilever until November 2021 when private equity company CVC Capital Partners purchased Unilever's tea unit, Ekaterra, and its interests in the venture. In 2012, PepsiCo announced Brisk had surpassed $1 billion in annual revenue, making it one of the 22 billion-dollar PepsiCo brands.

History 
Prior to being reformulated Brisk contained approximately 44 grams (11 teaspoons) of sugars per 16-ounce can. Since being reformulated with sucralose, the amount of sugars has been reduced in most varieties by approximately half.

Brisk is well known for its high-profile “That’s Brisk, baby!” campaigns. The J. Walter Thompson ad agency first launched the campaign in 1996, featuring pop-culture icons in claymation, and was revived in 2010 by creative agency Mekanism. The advertisements highlight exhausted celebrities who are dramatically reinvigorated by drinking Brisk. Frank Sinatra, Babe Ruth, Elvis Presley, Willie Nelson, Bruce Lee, Danny DeVito, Bruce Willis, Ozzy Osbourne, Sylvester Stallone (who voiced himself as Rocky Balboa), Danny Trejo and Eminem have all been featured in Brisk spots.

In an effort to compete with the Arizona Beverage Company's line of 99-cent iced tea cans, Lipton Brisk expanded its line of products in 2010 and lowered the price of its one-liter bottles to 99 cents. Brisk currently offers lemon iced tea, raspberry iced tea, sweet tea, peach green tea, green tea with mango dragonfruit, diet tea with lemon, fusion iced tea with lemonade, honey and ginseng iced tea, fusion white tea with pink lemonade, strawberry melon, fruit punch, lemonade, and diet lemonade.

References

External links
 

Products introduced in 1991
Tea brands in the United States
PepsiCo brands
Non-alcoholic drinks
Unilever brands
Joint ventures